Andrew Wilson (born September 16, 1993) is a retired American swimmer. At the 2020 Summer Olympics, he placed 6th in the 100 meter breaststroke, 17th in the 200 meter breaststroke, and won a gold medal in the 4x100 meter medley relay, for his efforts in the prelims of the relay.

Background
Wilson graduated from Phillips Academy in 2012 and Emory University in 2017, where he was a non-recruited member of the swim team.

Swimming career

2019 World Championships
Wilson competed in the 100 meter breaststroke at the 2019 World Aquatics Championships.

2021

2020 US Olympic Trials
In June 2021, he placed second at the 2020 US Olympic Team Trials in the final of the 100 meter breaststroke with a time of 58.74, qualifying for the 2020 Olympic Games in the event. He finished second in the 200 meter breaststroke as well, with a time of 2:08.32 and qualified for the US Olympic Swimming Team in his second individual event.

2020 Summer Olympics

At the 2020 Summer Olympics in Tokyo, Japan, Wilson competed in the 100 meter breaststroke, 4x100 meter mixed medley relay, and the 4x100 meter medley relay.

In the 100 meter breaststroke, Wilson finished sixth in the final of the event on day three of competition with a time of 58.99. In the prelims of the 200 meter breaststroke, he ranked 17th with a time of 2:09.97 and did not advance to the semifinals.

Wilson competed in the first race where men and women competed alongside each other in the pool in the same swimming event at an Olympic Games, the prelims of the 4x100 meter mixed medley relay. Along with his relay teammates Tom Shields, Regan Smith, and Abbey Weitzeil, the relay finished second overall and advanced to the final.

On day seven, Wilson swam the breaststroke leg of the 4x100 meter medley relay in the prelims, with Hunter Armstrong swimming backstroke, Tom Shields butterfly, and Blake Pieroni freestyle, the four advanced the relay to the final of the event, ranking seventh overall. The finals relay finished first in the final on the last day of competition and Wilson won a gold medal with the finals relay and other prelims relay swimmers for his contribution.

References

External links
 
 

1993 births
Living people
American male breaststroke swimmers
Medalists at the 2017 Summer Universiade
Medalists at the FINA World Swimming Championships (25 m)
Place of birth missing (living people)
Universiade gold medalists for the United States
Universiade medalists in swimming
World Aquatics Championships medalists in swimming
Emory University alumni
Swimmers at the 2020 Summer Olympics
Medalists at the 2020 Summer Olympics
Olympic gold medalists for the United States in swimming
Phillips Academy alumni